The Communauté de communes du Saulnois (Community of communes of Saulnois) is a federation of municipalities of the rural Saulnois region, located in the department of Moselle in Eastern France. It consists of 128 communes. Its seat is in Château-Salins. Its area is 974.4 km2, and its population was 28,853 in 2018.

Composition
The communauté de communes consists of the following 128 communes:

Aboncourt-sur-Seille
Achain
Ajoncourt
Alaincourt-la-Côte
Albestroff
Amelécourt
Attilloncourt
Aulnois-sur-Seille
Bacourt
Bassing
Baudrecourt
Bellange
Bénestroff
Bermering
Bezange-la-Petite
Bidestroff
Bioncourt
Blanche-Église
Bourdonnay
Bourgaltroff
Bréhain
Burlioncourt
Chambrey
Château-Bréhain
Château-Salins
Château-Voué
Chenois
Chicourt
Conthil
Craincourt
Cutting
Dalhain
Delme
Dieuze
Domnom-lès-Dieuze
Donjeux
Donnelay
Fonteny
Fossieux
Francaltroff
Frémery
Fresnes-en-Saulnois
Gelucourt
Gerbécourt
Givrycourt
Grémecey
Guébestroff
Guéblange-lès-Dieuze
Guébling
Guinzeling
Haboudange
Hampont
Hannocourt
Haraucourt-sur-Seille
Honskirch
Insming
Insviller
Jallaucourt
Juvelize
Juville
Lagarde
Laneuveville-en-Saulnois
Lemoncourt
Léning
Lesse
Ley
Lezey
Lhor
Lidrezing
Lindre-Basse
Lindre-Haute
Liocourt
Lostroff
Loudrefing
Lubécourt
Lucy
Maizières-lès-Vic
Malaucourt-sur-Seille
Manhoué
Marimont-lès-Bénestroff
Marsal
Marthille
Molring
Moncourt
Montdidier
Morville-lès-Vic
Morville-sur-Nied
Moyenvic
Mulcey
Munster
Nébing
Neufvillage
Obreck
Ommeray
Oriocourt
Oron
Pettoncourt
Pévange
Prévocourt
Puttigny
Puzieux
Réning
Riche
Rodalbe
Rorbach-lès-Dieuze
Saint-Epvre
Saint-Médard
Salonnes
Sotzeling
Tarquimpol
Tincry
Torcheville
Vahl-lès-Bénestroff
Val-de-Bride
Vannecourt
Vaxy
Vergaville
Vibersviller
Vic-sur-Seille
Villers-sur-Nied
Virming
Vittersbourg
Viviers
Wuisse
Xanrey
Xocourt
Zarbeling
Zommange

References

Saulnois
Saulnois